Johnny Murray (June 12, 1904 - August 1, 1956) was an American voice actor. In 1929, he was under a contract with First National Pictures to sing for Richard Barthelmess in his films; he provided Barthelmess's voice in Weary River. He is most famous today for his role as Bosko, the first star of Warner Brothers cartoons, starting with Bosko the Doughboy. He was the voice actor for Bosko in the 1933 short, Bosko's Picture Show. This cartoon is infamous for perhaps containing the first cartoon depiction of Adolf Hitler, and possibly of being among the first, if not first, widely distributed films that contain verbal usage of the f-bomb.

References

External links

American male voice actors
20th-century American male actors
Warner Bros. Cartoons voice actors
1904 births
1956 deaths